= Paweł Grabias =

Polish teacher and YouTuber

YouTube information
- Channel: Rock Your English
- Years active: 2017–present
- Genre: English language education
- Subscribers: 580 thousand

Paweł Grabias is a Polish English teacher, entrepreneur, and YouTuber, best known as the creator of the educational YouTube channel Rock Your English.

== Biography ==
Grabias studied English philology and has worked as an English teacher in Poland. He describes himself as a fan of rock music, especially Queen; Snoopy, and black coffee.

In addition to YouTube, Grabias runs online group and individual English courses.

== Rock Your English ==
Grabias launched Rock Your English in 2015 as a modern approach to English education. He aimed to create content that was both methodologically sound and engaging, going beyond traditional classroom materials.

Initially, he combined his school teaching job with creating YouTube videos. However, as the channel grew, he decided to leave his full-time teaching position, closing down his traditional language learning school, to focus entirely on online education.
